The Pacific Northwest Hockey League was an amateur mixed-level ice hockey league in British Columbia in the 1970s and 1980s. The teams that played in the league were of both the Junior and Intermediate level due to the distances between towns in the area. It operated within the British Columbia Amateur Hockey Association. There were teams in Prince Rupert, Kitimat, Terrace, Smithers, Burns Lake, Houston, Granisle, Fraser Lake, and Vanderhoof.

At its peak in the mid-1970s there were 10 teams.  The Intermediate teams were the Smithers Totems, Houston Luckies, Burns Lake Braves, Kitimat Eagles and Prince Rupert Kings.  The Junior teams were the Prince George Spruce Kings, Vanderhoof Jr. Bears, Smithers Nats, Terrace Centennials and Kitimat Cohos. There were a number of notables that played in the PNWHL.  One was Bill Riley who won scoring titles playing for the Kitimat Eagles and made the jump to the NHL with the Washington Capitals.  Another was Larry Playfair who Doug played for the Jr. Bears in Vanderhoof and went on to an NHL career with the Buffalo Sabres.  There were a number of players with outstanding talent including Dave Pickett with the Prince Rupert Kings, Doug Stumpf, Gord Cook and brothers Harry and Hugh Bell all of whom played for the Houston Luckies.  Many of the young junior players moved on to  Junior Leagues such as the Western Canada Tier 1 after honing their talent against the Intermediate teams in the PNWHL

References

Defunct ice hockey leagues in British Columbia
1970s establishments in British Columbia
1980s disestablishments in British Columbia
Sports leagues established in the 1970s
Sports leagues established in the 1980s